The Legend of Rockabye Point is a 1955 Chilly Willy cartoon directed by Tex Avery and produced by Walter Lantz. 
The short was repurposed in episode 3 of The New Woody Woodpecker Show as "A Classic Chilly Cartoon".

Plot

An old fisherman tells the legend of a starving polar bear (Charlie) and a penguin (Chilly Willy) who attempted to steal bluefin tuna from his ship 20 years before.

As both Charlie and Chilly Willy rush over to the boat - each with a sack in hand to steal themselves a haul of fish, Charlie manages to tie up Chilly Willy in his own sack and tosses him away, hoping to get all the fish for himself. Unfortunately for Charlie, he  runs afoul of a vicious guard dog aboard the ship, who bites him in his rear end.

As the dog heads back inside of the ship to sleep, Charlie makes his move and begins to grab as much fish as he can. From above, a mischievous Chilly sprinkles black pepper over Charlie's nose in attempt to stimulate him into sneezing, and in conjunction, waking up the dog. Charlie manages to hold in his sneeze, runs outside of the ship, then sneezes, before running back inside to resume bagging fish. Chilly then places a roller skate underneath Charlie's foot just as he steps backward, causing him to slip and land on the dog. To placate the snarling beast, Charlie rocks him in his arms, singing "Rock-A-Bye Baby" to him to make him nod off, which serves as a running gag throughout the short, as Chilly repeatedly attempts to wake the dog up to foil Charlie's plots to steal all of the fish.

Chilly's next attempt to wake the dog up involves placing several lit firecrackers around him. Charlie manages to plug the dog's ears just before the firecrackers burst, then sings him to sleep again. Chilly then ties the sleeping dog to Charlie's ankle with rope, then sticks a lit firecracker into the dog's mouth. As Charlie suddenly realizes this, he drops the fish, unties the rope around his ankle, holds the firecracker in his own mouth, and picks up the fish before running off again. As Charlie puts down the fish and opens the door to exit, Chilly swaps out the fish for the sleeping dog. Upon rushing outside into the snow Charlie suddenly realizes he is holding the dog, and the firecracker explodes, waking up the dog, who bites Charlie in the rear again. Charlie then sings the dog to sleep again.

As Charlie runs back into the ship to grab more fish, Chilly pushes the dog right behind Charlie, who, upon attempting to run back outside, trips over the dog, who once again bites him in the posterior, forcing Charlie to sing him to sleep yet again.

While Charlie gathers more fish, Chilly drops an anvil over the dog to wake him up. Charlie takes the anvil to the head instead, holding in his scream, then runs over to a nearby desk and writes down on a piece of paper, "Ouch!". As he angrily squints, he flips the paper over, revealing a series of symbols indicating profanity. As Charlie puts down the anvil, he accidentally drops it on the dog, forcing him to sing to him again.

Chilly puts a clarinet in the dog's mouth as he sleeps. The dog becomes cranky from the off-key notes coming from the clarinet, but the bear lulls him to sleep by using a nearby music sheet to play "Rock-A-Bye Baby" on the clarinet. Chilly sneakily puts new sheet notes in front of Charlie, who ends up playing "Circus March" instead, thus causing the dog to reawaken. The dog bites Charlie in the rear end yet again, but Charlie knocks him out by clubbing him over the head with the clarinet.

At this point, Chilly lifts the dog's eyelids himself. The dog snarls and runs towards Charlie, who narrowly dodges him and then locks him in the fish storage room. However, the dog manages to break through the iron door and bite Charlie's backside yet again. Charlie attempts to protect himself by covering his posterior with a wooden barrel, but upon feeling a bite, Charlie removes the barrel to find the dog underneath, teeth locked onto his rear. Charlie slams the lid onto the barrel and begins rocking it in his arms, singing the dog to sleep again.

Charlie then decides to take the dog outside into the snow where he cannot cause him any more harm. He runs back inside the ship where he finds Chilly with a bulging full sack. Charlie steals the sack and flicks Chilly away with his toe, then boards a motorboat and speeds off to a nearby tall iceberg. Charlie runs to the top of the peak, ready to eat what he thinks is a large pile of fresh fish, but as he empties the sack, the guard dog falls out. Charlie quickly grabs the dog and sings him to sleep yet again.
At the end of the film, the fisherman finishes the story and says to the audience that if they listen carefully, they can to this day still hear the lullaby at night. Indeed, at the peak, the pair still stand - now both very old and grey - with Charlie holding the dog tenderly and continuing to sing "Rock-A-Bye Baby" at the dog's request.

Production
This is also the second (and last) Chilly Willy cartoon directed by Avery.

Accolades
It was nominated for an Academy Award for Best Animated Short Film, but lost to Speedy Gonzales.

References

External links
 
 
 Video

1955 animated films
Walter Lantz Productions shorts
Films directed by Tex Avery
1950s American animated films
Films about polar bears
1950s English-language films
1955 short films
Animated films about penguins
Animated films about bears
Animated films about dogs
Universal Pictures animated short films
Films with screenplays by Michael Maltese
Films set on ships
American animated short films
Universal Pictures short films